Bertha Porush (1903–2009) was rebbetzin (rabbi's wife) in the Great Synagogue, Sydney. She was pivotal in the development of women's representation and service.

Early life
Bertha Porush was born in Berlin in 1903. Her parents were Isidor and Mathilde Link.

Influence 
She moved to London in the 1930s where she met her husband Dr Rabbi Israel Porush. Israel Porush had been born in Jerusalem and educated in Germany.  In 1940 they moved to Sydney because Israel was appointed Rabbi of the Great Synagogue, the oldest surviving synagogue in Sydney, Australia.

Porush served as rebbetzin, or rabbi's wife, alongside her husband. Porush, as the rabbi's wife, held an important an influential role performing outreach, social tasks and being an intermediary for synagogue members who did not feel comfortable approaching the rabbi directly.

In 1941, Porush formed a women's auxiliary open to any female members providing a forum for women's involvement in the management of the synagogue. Before this, only wives of the Chief Minister and Board members were allowed to participate in decision making. The women's auxiliary drew together all the existing women's groups, women who had worked for the synagogue, and the Sacred Vestments Guild. Apple describes her as having “extraordinary foresight” and notes that her “influence on the women of the community was remarkable. In 1969, Porush was made a life member of the Women's Auxiliary.

Porush was president of the Education Auxiliary Board of the NSW Board of Jewish Education for 20 years. In this role she worked closely with the Women's Auxiliary, performing tasks such as raising funds and presenting prayer books to Barmitzvah boys and Batmitzvah girls. In the late 1950s, Porush proposed that there should be a Junior Auxiliary to train young married women for future leadership. This group was convened in May 1961.

Death 
In 1975, Porush and her husband moved to Caufield, Melbourne. After his death in 1991, Porush moved with her daughter to Jerusalem, where she died aged 105.

Family
Porush had two daughters, Judith (b.1935 d. 1969) and Naomi (b. 1937).

References 

1903 births
2009 deaths
20th-century Australian women
Australian centenarians
German centenarians
Israeli centenarians
People from Berlin
Rebbetzins
Women centenarians